Rinascita Basket Rimini (RBR), formerly known as Basket Rimini and Basket Rimini Crabs, is an Italian basketball team based in Rimini, Emilia-Romagna.

From the 1978–79 to the 2010–11 season, the team continuously played in professional basketball between Serie A1 and Serie A2/Legadue, with one exception, the 1990–91 season (played in Serie B1).

History
The team was officially established in 1947. As Polisportiva Libertas, they spent their first decades in the regional leagues. In 1972, the team was promoted for the first time in Serie B, the second highest league in Italy at the time. It was also renamed to Basket Rimini.

In 1974, Alberto Bucci was appointed as new head coach. During his five-year stint, he led the team from Serie D to the first historic Serie A2 participation in the 1978–79 season, that brought the first American basketball players to Rimini.

On April 8, 1984 the team was promoted to the Serie A1, the highest-tier level of the Italian league system, where it played in the following three years, reaching the quarter-finals in 1985. After three years in Serie A2, it was relegated to Serie B, but a double promotion brought them back to Serie A1 in just two years. Part of that team was made up of the youngsters who won the junior national title in 1989 including Carlton Myers, Italy's future flag-bearer at the opening ceremony of the 2000 Sydney Olympics.

In 1993, Basket Rimini was relegated again to Serie A2, then three times came close to return to A1, finally achieving this at the end of the 1996–97 season. Basket Rimini advanced to the Serie A1 quarter-finals in both the 1997–98 and 1998–99 seasons, qualifying for the following year's FIBA Korać Cup. With a last-place finish in the 2000–01 Serie A1, the club fell into Legadue, the new name of Serie A2. Simultaneously, Basket Rimini was renamed to Basket Rimini Crabs.

In 2011, the side was unable to participate in the Legadue due to debts, moving to the fourth-division DNB instead following the intervention of Luciano Capicchioni, who already owned the team in the past. At the end of the 2017–18 season, concluded with the relegation of the first team in Serie C, Capicchioni decided to maintain only the activities of the youth teams.

In May 2020, Rinascita Basket Rimini (founded in 2018 and already operating) acquired the historical title of Basket Rimini Crabs. At that time, the team was playing in Serie B. In the 2021–22 season, they clinched promotion to the Serie A2, ending a 10-year absence from the second flight.

Notable players

Sponsorship names

Over the years, due to sponsorship, the club has been known as:

As Basket Rimini:
Sarila (1972–1980)
Sacramora (1980–1983)
Marr (1983–1986)
Hamby (1986–1987)
Biklim (1987–1988)
Marr (1988–1993)
Olio Monini (1993–1994)
Teamsystem (1994–1995)
Koncret (1995–1997)
Pepsi (1997–2000)
Vip (2000–2001)
As Basket Rimini Crabs:
Conad (2001–2002)
Vip (2002–2003)
Conad (2003–2005)
Coopsette (2005–2009)
Riviera Solare (2009–2010)
Edilizia Moderna (2010)
Immobiliare Spiga (2010–2011)
NTS Informatica (2015–2018)
As Rinascita Basket Rimini:
RivieraBanca (2020–...)

References

External links 
 Official website
 Serie A historical results  Retrieved 9 April 2021

1947 establishments in Italy
Basketball teams established in 1947
Basketball teams in Emilia-Romagna